Mangla Sharma is a Pakistani politician who has been a member of the Provincial Assembly of Sindh since August 2018.

Political career

She was elected to the Provincial Assembly of Sindh as a candidate of Muttahida Qaumi Movement (MQM) on a reserved seat for women in 2018 Pakistani general election.

Personal life
Sharma belongs to the Hindu community.

See also
Pushpa Kumari Kohli

References

Living people
Muttahida Qaumi Movement MPAs (Sindh)
Year of birth missing (living people)
Pakistani Hindus